Wynn-Williams is a surname. It may refer to:

 C. E. Wynn-Williams (1903–1979), Welsh-born physicist
 Henry Wynn-Williams (1828–1913), 19th-century Member of Parliament and prominent lawyer in Christchurch
 Wynn Williams & Co, a law firm in Christchurch named after the above

See also
 Williams-Wynn

Compound surnames
Surnames of Welsh origin